The year 2009 is the 21st year in the history of Shooto, a mixed martial arts promotion based in Japan. In 2009 Shooto held 30 events beginning with, Shooto: Shooto Tradition 5.

Title fights

Events list

Shooto: Shooto Tradition 5

Shooto: Shooto Tradition 5 was an event held on January 18, 2009, at Differ Ariake Arena in Tokyo, Japan.

Results

Shooto: Shooting Disco 7: Young Man

Shooto: Shooting Disco 7: Young Man was an event held on January 31, 2009, at Shinjuku Face in Tokyo, Japan.

Results

Shooto: Gig Tokyo 1

Shooto: Gig Tokyo 1 was an event held on February 28, 2009, at Shinjuku Face in Tokyo, Japan.

Results

Shooto: Border: Season 1: Outbreak

Shooto: Border: Season 1: Outbreak was an event held on March 8, 2009, at Hirano Ward Community Hall in Osaka, Kansai, Japan.

Results

Shooto: Shooto Tradition 6

Shooto: Shooto Tradition 6 was an event held on March 20, 2009, at Korakuen Hall in Tokyo, Japan.

Results

Shooto: Gig Torao 2

Shooto: Gig Torao 2 was an event held on March 22, 2009, at The Fukuyama Industrial Exchange Center in Fukuyama, Hiroshima, Japan.

Results

Shooto: Shooting Disco 8: We Are Tarzan!

Shooto: Shooting Disco 8: We Are Tarzan! was an event held on April 10, 2009, at Shinjuku Face in Tokyo, Japan.

Results

Shooto: Gig Central 17

Shooto: Gig Central 17 was an event held on April 12, 2009, at Asunal Kanayama Hall in Nagoya, Aichi, Japan.

Results

Shooto: Gig Tokyo 2

Shooto: Gig Tokyo 2 was an event held on April 19, 2009, at Shinjuku Face in Tokyo, Japan.

Results

Shooto: Gig West 11

Shooto: Gig West 11 was an event held on April 29, 2009, at Azalea Taisho Hall in Osaka, Kansai, Japan.

Results

Shooto: Shooto Tradition Final

Shooto: Shooto Tradition Final was an event held on May 10, 2009, at Tokyo Dome City Hall in Tokyo, Japan.

Results

Shooto: Grapplingman 8

Shooto: Grapplingman 8 was an event held on May 17, 2009, at Hiroshima Industrial Hall in Tokyo, Japan.

Results

Shooto: Kitazawa Shooto 2009 Vol. 1

Shooto: Kitazawa Shooto 2009 Vol. 1 was an event held on May 20, 2009, at Kitazawa Town Hall in Tokyo, Japan.

Results

Shooto: Spirit 2009

Shooto: Spirit 2009 was an event held on May 24, 2009, at Accel Hall in Sendai, Miyagi, Japan.

Results

Shooto: Shooting Disco 9: Superman

Shooto: Shooting Disco 9: Superman was an event held on June 6, 2009, at Shinjuku Face in Tokyo, Japan.

Results

Shooto: Gig North 4

Shooto: Gig North 4 was an event held on June 7, 2009, at Zepp Sapporo in Sapporo, Hokkaido, Japan.

Results

Shooto: Revolutionary Exchanges 1: Undefeated

Shooto: Revolutionary Exchanges 1: Undefeated was an event held on July 19, 2009, at Korakuen Hall in Tokyo, Japan.

Results

Shooto: Gig Saitama 1

Shooto: Gig Saitama 1 was an event held on August 9, 2009, at Fujimi Culture Hall in Fujimi, Saitama, Japan.

Results

Shooto: Border: Season 1: Advance

Shooto: Border: Season 1: Advance was an event held on August 16, 2009, at Hirano Ward Community Hall in Osaka, Kansai, Japan.

Results

Shooto: Gig Central 18

Shooto: Gig Central 18 was an event held on August 30, 2009, at Asunal Kanayama Hall in Nagoya, Aichi, Japan.

Results

Shooto: Kitazawa Shooto 2009 Vol. 2

Shooto: Kitazawa Shooto 2009 Vol. 2 was an event held on September 4, 2009, at Kitazawa Town Hall in Tokyo, Japan.

Results

Shooto: Shooting Disco 10: Twist and Shooto

Shooto: Shooting Disco 10: Twist and Shooto was an event held on September 20, 2009, at Shinjuku Face in Tokyo, Japan.

Results

Shooto: Revolutionary Exchanges 2

Shooto: Revolutionary Exchanges 2 was an event held on September 22, 2009, at Korakuen Hall in Tokyo, Japan.

Results

Shooto: Border: Season 1: Clash

Shooto: Border: Season 1: Clash was an event held on October 4, 2009, at Hirano Ward Community Hall in Osaka, Kansai, Japan.

Results

Shooto: Gig Tokyo 3

Shooto: Gig Tokyo 3 was an event held on October 18, 2009, at Shinjuku Face in Tokyo, Japan.

Results

Shooto: Gig Central 19

Shooto: Gig Central 19 was an event held on October 25, 2009, at Asunal Kanayama Hall in Nagoya, Aichi, Japan.

Results

Shooto: Revolutionary Exchanges 3

Shooto: Revolutionary Exchanges 3 was an event held on November 23, 2009, at Tokyo Dome City Hall in Tokyo, Japan.

Results

Shooto: Grapplingman 9

Shooto: Grapplingman 9 was an event held on November 29, 2009, at Kitajima North Park General Fitness Center in Kitajima, Tokushima, Japan.

Results

Shooto: The Rookie Tournament 2009 Final

Shooto: The Rookie Tournament 2009 Final was an event held on December 13, 2009, at Shinjuku Face in Tokyo, Japan.

Results

Shooto: Alternative 1

Shooto: Alternative 1 was an event held on December 23, 2009, at Sumiyoshi Community Center Hall in Osaka, Kansai, Japan.

Results

See also 
 Shooto
 List of Shooto champions
 List of Shooto Events

References

Shooto events
2009 in mixed martial arts